The 1981 San Diego State Aztecs football team represented San Diego State University during the 1981 NCAA Division I-A football season as a member of the Western Athletic Conference (WAC).

The team was led by head coach Doug Scovil, in his first year, and played home games at Jack Murphy Stadium in San Diego, California. They finished with a record of six wins and five losses (6–5, 3–5 WAC).

The Aztecs were chosen to participate in the annual Mirage Bowl in 1981. This counted as a regular season game, and was played at the end of the season in Tokyo, Japan. They played the Air Force Academy on Nov. 29.

Schedule

Team players in the NFL
The following were selected in the 1982 NFL Draft.

The following finished their college career in 1981, were not drafted, but played in the NFL.

Team awards

Notes

References

San Diego State
San Diego State Aztecs football seasons
San Diego State Aztecs football